The Aquarian Tabernacle Church (ATC) is a Wiccan church located in Index, Washington. It is one of the first Wiccan organisations to receive full legal recognition as a church in the United States and Australia. The church has an umbrella 501c(3), there are 29 affiliate churches in North America, with 3 additional affiliates on other continents and 7 countries. (As of January 2015). The ATC founded SpiralScouts International and Woolston-Steen Theological Seminary, a degree giving college recognized by the Washington State government that can give degrees from Associates to Doctorates in Wiccan Ministry. Through Woolston-Steen Seminary, the church offers prison chaplaincy programs.

History

The Aquarian Tabernacle Church (ATC) was founded in 1979 by Pete Davis, who died at 6pm on 31 October 2014. The mother church is located in Index, WA. The current Arch Priestess is Rev. Lady Belladonna Laveau.

Purpose
The Aquarian Tabernacle Church is a positive, life-affirming spirituality, a non-dualist, non-racist, non-sexist, non-exclusivist, ecologically oriented faith dedicated to the preservation of Holy Mother Earth, the revival of the worship of The Old Gods in a modern context, the achievement of the fullest of human potentials and the creation of a peaceful world of love, freedom, health and prosperity for all sentient beings.

Festivals
The ATC hosts two festivals every year.

Spring Mysteries Festival this festival allegedly celebrates the  Eleusinian Mysteries. This festival provides a ritual experience allowing one to speak to the gods that Wild Hunt columnist Mary Shoup called "a life-changing experience." It occurs on the weekend of Easter every year. The first year was 1985.

Hecate's Sickle Festival celebrates the traditional Wiccan Samhain theme, and participate in workshops and classes that allow them to explore the grief and death aspects of the Wiccan belief structure, as well as undergo healing experiences that will help them move from the dark half to the light half of our year. It occurs in October every year. The first year was in 1989.

See also
SpiralScouts International
List of Neopagan movements
Pete Davis
Woolston-Steen Theological Seminary

References

Footnotes

Sources
Aquarian Tabernacle Church International
Aquarian Tabernacle Church
In Honor of Our Founder | Aquarian Tabernacle Church

External links

Aquarian Tabernacle Church (international)
Aquarian Tabernacle Church of Canada
ATC Wicca
The Encyclopedia of Modern Witchcraft and Neo-Paganism, Edited by: Shelley Rabinovitch, James Lewis
Panegyria
The Encyclopedia of Witches, Witchcraft and Wicca By Rosemary Guiley
The Encyclopedia of Modern Witchcraft and Neo-Paganism  edited by Shelley Rabinovitch, James Lewis

Modern pagan organizations established in 1979
Wicca in Australia
Wicca in Canada
Wicca in the United States
Wiccan organisations
Modern pagan organizations based in the United States
1979 establishments in Washington (state)